The servant mouse (Mus famulus) or Bonhote's mouse, is a species of rodent in the family Muridae.
It is found only in the Western Ghats of South India, where it is restricted to Eravikulam National Park, Avalanche, Kalapatti, and Coonoor.

Habitat and ecology 
The servant mouse is a nocturnal terrestrial rodent. Its natural habitats are subtropical or tropical dry forests and subtropical or tropical dry lowland grassland.

Conservation status  
The servant mouse has been classified as on the IUCN Red List as Endangered since 1996 primarily because of wide spread habitat destruction.
It has been listed in the schedule V of the Indian Wildlife Protection Act. 1972 amended in 2002.

References

Mus (rodent)
Rodents of India
Mammals described in 1898
Taxa named by J. Lewis Bonhote
Taxonomy articles created by Polbot